Huai Sak is a tambon (subdistrict) of Mueang Chiang Rai District, in Chiang Rai Province, Thailand. In 2018 it had a total population of 17,302 people.

Administration

Central administration
The tambon is subdivided into 31 administrative villages (muban).

Local administration
The whole area of the subdistrict is covered by the subdistrict municipality (Thesaban Tambon) Huai Sak (เทศบาลตำบลห้วยสัก).

References

External links
Thaitambon.com on Huai Sak

Tambon of Chiang Rai province
Populated places in Chiang Rai province